Dewdanr is a village in the Poraiyahat CD block in the Godda subdivision of the Godda district in the Indian state of Jharkhand.

Geography

Location                                          

Overview
Rajmahal coalfield is shown in the map. The entire area is overwhelmingly rural with only small pockets of urbanisation.

Note: The full screen map is interesting. All places marked on the map are linked and you can easily move on to another page of your choice. Enlarge the map to see what else is there – one gets railway links, many more road links and so on.

Demographics
According to the 2011 Census of India, Dewdanr had a total population of 12, of which 8 (67%) were males and 4 (33%) were females.

Civic administration

Police station
Deodanr police station serves the Poraiyahat CD block.

References

Villages in Godda district